Waldemar Rosenberger, (Vladimir Karlovich Rozenberger, 1848–1918) from Saint Petersburg, Russia, became director of the International Volapük Academy in 1892.  Under his leadership, the Academy began to experiment more with the Volapük language.  In 1902 the Academy proposed a heavily revised version which was known as Neutral and later Idiom Neutral.

Constructed language creators
Academics from Saint Petersburg
Volapük
1848 births
1918 deaths